Zhitnitsa ("granary") is a village in central southern Bulgaria, part of Kaloyanovo Municipality, Plovdiv Province. Zhitnitsa is mostly inhabited by Roman Catholic Bulgarians, descendants of medieval Paulicians.

History 
Ottoman sources from the 17th century refer to an early sixteenth-century village in the approximate area by the name of Anbarli, province Göpsi, which may be a reference to Zhitnitsa. Until 1934, the village was known as Hambarlii, a possible cognate to Anbarli. In any case, Zhitnitsa appears to have been founded no later than 1646, during the Ottoman rule of Bulgaria, as a Turkish-owned farm. The farm was manned and worked by Bulgarian Paulicians from Sopot and Kalabrovo, who settled in the vicinity and established the village. According to an 18th-century report by papal missionary Nikola Radovani, the village had 54 houses inhabited by 341 Catholics, though an Eastern Orthodox population was also present. The construction of the first Roman Catholic church in the village commenced in 1874 under Capuchin father Ernesto. The current Gothic Revival church was built in 1922–1923.

Notable people 
Notable natives include weightlifter and 2004 Olympic gold medalist Milen Dobrev (b. 1980) and footballer Atanas Bornosuzov (b. 1979).

Gallery

References

1646 establishments in the Ottoman Empire
Villages in Plovdiv Province